The Altamira Gathering was a five-day media conference organized by the Kayapo people in an effort to raise awareness of the ecological and political atrocities committed by the Brazilian government and by illegal gold mining also.

Between February 19 and 24 in 1989 over 600 Amazonian Indians gathered at the port city of Altamira at the banks of the Xingu river.  The protest was organized by the Coordination of the Indigenous Organizations of the Brazilian Amazon.

The Altamira Gathering was the first large gathering of all groups that were threatened by the creation of the Belo Monte Dam, originally called the Kararao Dam but renamed at the time of the gathering.  Over 500 Kayapo and 100 members of 40 other indigenous nations whom the Kayapo invited to join them rallied to voice their views on the dams and the destruction of the forest.  Five days of meetings, speeches, press conferences, and ritual performances by the Kayapo were executed without a major hitch.

Much of the credit for the event belongs to the Ecumenical Center for Documentation and Information.  The event required handling many logistical tasks that led to the success of the meeting; this included the transportation, lodging, and feeding of hundreds of indigenous people while constructing a large encampment with traditional Kayapo shelters at a Catholic church retreat outside the town. Transport for the indigenous peoples was funded by Anita Roddick of the Body Shop.

After being picked up by the international media circuit the Pope sent a telegram and the rock star Sting flew in to give a press conference in support of the Altamira Gathering. Other visitors and speakers included British parliamentarian Tam Dalyell, and the environmentalist J. Lutzemberger. The event was in the short term successful due to the large international support raised by the media; TV crews from four continents were present.  Within two weeks the World Bank announced that would not confer the loan earmarked for the dam.  The Brazilian National Congress also announced plans to conduct a formal investigation into the entire plan.

However, there was also vociferous support for the dam from local trade organisations and trade unions, for whom the hydroelectric scheme represented progress and prosperity. After protracted political delays and redesigns, and a second 'gathering' of indigenous peoples at Altamira in May 2008, work on the dam commenced in 2011.

References

Kayapo people
Xingu peoples
Indigenous topics of the Amazon
February 1989 events in South America
Pará
1989 conferences